The 2020 Women's World Ice Hockey Championships were the 22nd such series of tournaments organised by the International Ice Hockey Federation. Teams were supposed to play at six tiers of competition. However, four of the six tournaments were cancelled due to the COVID-19 pandemic. The competition also served as qualifications for the 2021 competition and finalized seeding for the 2022 Winter Olympics qualification.

Championship (Top Division)

The tournament would have been played in Halifax and Truro, Nova Scotia, Canada, from 31 March to 10 April 2020. It was cancelled on 7 March 2020 due to the COVID-19 pandemic. The women's national ice hockey teams of Canada, Finland, Russia, Switzerland, and the United States were scheduled to compete in Group A; the national teams of the Czech Republic, Denmark, Germany, Hungary, and Japan were scheduled to compete in Group B.

Division I

Division I Group A
The Division I Group A tournament would have been played in Angers, France, from 12 to 18 April 2020. It was cancelled on 7 March 2020 due to the coronavirus outbreak. The women's national teams of Austria, France, the Netherlands, Norway, Slovakia, and Sweden were scheduled to compete in the tournament.

Division I Group B
The Division I Group B tournament would have been played in Katowice, Poland, from 28 March to 3 April 2020. On 2 March 2020, the tournament was cancelled due to the coronavirus outbreak. The women's national teams of China, Italy, Kazakhstan, Poland, Slovenia, and South Korea were scheduled to compete in the tournament.

Division II

Division II Group A
The Division II Group A tournament would have been played in Jaca, Spain, from 29 March to 4 April 2020. On 2 March 2020, the tournament was cancelled due to the COVID-19 pandemic. The women's national teams of Chinese Taipei, Great Britain, Latvia, Mexico, DPR Korea, and Spain were scheduled to compete in the tournament.

Division II Group B
The Division II Group B tournament was played in Akureyri, Iceland, from 23 to 29 February 2020.

Division III

The Division III tournament was played in Sofia, Bulgaria, from 4 to 10 December 2019.

References

External links
Official website of IIHF

 
World Ice Hockey Championships - Women's
IIHF Women's World Ice Hockey Championships
Women's Ice Hockey World Championships